Aq Qui may refer to:
 Aq Qui, Tehran (اق قويي - Āq Qū'ī)
 Aq Qui, Zanjan (آق قوئي - Aq Qū’ī)